Tomas Morgan Johansson (born 14 May 1970) is a Swedish politician of the Social Democrats who served as Deputy Prime Minister of Sweden from 2019 to 2022. He served as Minister for Justice from 2014 to 2022 and as minister for home affairs from 2021 to 2022, having previously served in that position from 2017 to 2019. He also served as Minister for Migration and Asylum Policy from 2014 to 2017 and again from 2019 to 2021.

Johansson was previously Minister for Public Health and Social Services in the Persson Cabinet from 2002 to 2006 and has been a Member of the Riksdag for the southern Skåne County electoral district since the 1998 elections. As a member of the opposition, he was Chairman of the Committee on Justice of the Riksdag from 2010 to 2014.

Career

Early career
Johansson worked as a journalist and editorial writer for the social democratic daily newspaper Arbetet Nyheterna 1994-1997 and as a political expert in the Prime Minister's Office from 1997 to 1998.

In 2010, author Christer Isaksson described Johansson as a member of the left-leaning faction of the Social Democratic Party. He is also a member of the Swedish Humanist Association and has previously served on the association board.

Minister of Justice
Johansson was appointed minister of justice on 3 October 2014 in Stefan Löfven’s cabinet. 

On 23 March 2015, Johansson was attacked at the Broby hospital asylum center in Broby, Östra Göinge Municipality, Skåne. A 25-year-old man charged at Johansson and sprayed him with a fire extinguisher. The attacker was quickly apprehended and Johansson was not injured in what was referred to as a premeditated assault.

In November 2019, the Sweden Democrats issued a vote of no confidence at Johansson due to the escalating gang crime and the ongoing bombing campaign. The no confidence vote was supported by Moderate Party and the Christian Democrats but at 151 votes against the needed 175, did not have enough votes in the Riksdag to carry. The no confidence vote was interpreted as a signal from those three opposition parties that the government was losing control of the situation.

On 26 December 2020, during the COVID-19 pandemic, Johansson was seen shopping at Nova Lund, a small shopping mall in Lund. He was accompanied with several bodyguards. This was criticised because he violated the recommendations from the Public Health Agency of Sweden. Prime Minister Stefan Löfven condemned the act, saying it was "careless".

On 12 December 2021, Johansson stated that the Stockholm police had failed in fighting crime. He also mentioned that municipalities that failed fighting crime could learn from those who successfully did so. He also specified that there were boundaries for how far the government would go when it came to legislation. He also said he didn’t want to go further with body searches and raising the limit for exclude severe criminal gang members.

On 2 June 2022, the Sweden Democrats announced a motion of no confidence in Johansson due to what they perceived as inaction against criminal gangs. The motion was supported by the Moderates, Christian Democrats, and the Liberals. Prime Minister Magdalena Andersson called the motion "irresponsible" and could have "serious consequences", adding that if the motion is passed, the entire government would resign. Johansson himself stated that the opposition parties were utilising attacks on his person and argued that they did not have any better solutions to reduce the recruitment of people into criminal gangs. Ultimately, the motion failed with 174 votes in favour, one short of the required 175, with independent Amineh Kakabaveh being the key vote in abstaining.

References

External links

|-

|-

|-

|-

|-

|-

|-

|-

|-

1970 births
Members of the Riksdag from the Social Democrats
People from Höganäs Municipality
Living people
Swedish humanists
Swedish Ministers for Justice
Swedish Ministers for Migration and Asylum Policy
Deputy Prime Ministers of Sweden
Members of the Riksdag 1998–2002
Members of the Riksdag 2002–2006
Members of the Riksdag 2006–2010
Members of the Riksdag 2010–2014
Members of the Riksdag 2014–2018
Members of the Riksdag 2018–2022
Members of the Riksdag 2022–2026